Darcy Proper is a mastering engineer based at Valhalla Studios NY in Auburn NY. In 2008, she became the first woman engineer to win a Grammy for the Best Surround Sound Album. To date, she has won four Grammy Awards and been nominated for eleven. She has mastered historical reissues for artists such as Johnny Cash, Billie Holiday, Louis Armstrong, and Frank Sinatra, and stereo releases for artists such as Steely Dan, The Eagles, Donald Fagen, and Porcupine Tree.

Early life and education 
Proper grew up in Upstate New York performing in choir, jazz ensemble, and school band. She was initially uncomfortable as a performer, preferring to listen to and analyze her parents' music collection. In addition to music, she excelled in math and science. These interests came to an intersection at age 14 when she attended a school event featuring student rock bands. She became interested in the mixing board used to run the sound system, introducing her to audio engineering.

At age seventeen, Proper attended New York University and was one of only three women in a class of 150 students admitted to NYU's Music Technology program. While studying in New York City, she had several internships and worked in a dance remix studio as an assistant studio technician. She graduated in 1990 with a Bachelor of Music in Music Technology.

Career 
After university, Proper first began working as an Assistant Studio Maintenance Technician for SoundWorks in Manhattan. In a few years, Proper took a job with Sony Classics as a Quality Control Engineer because of her ability to quickly learn the digital audio workstation Sonic Solutions. She eventually rose to a mastering position where she worked with  clients on remastering historic pop standards and Broadway recordings. Seven years later, she became the Senior Mastering Engineer at Sony Music Studios and expanded her discography to include front-line releases and high-resolution surround sound mastering.

In 2005, Proper joined Galaxy Studios in Belgium as a Senior Mastering Engineer. There she met her future husband, Dutch recording and mixing engineer, Ronald Prent. Five years later, Proper and Prent moved to the Netherlands and worked to rebuild Wisseloord Studios where Proper became Director of Mastering.

In 2015, Proper and Prent founded Proper Prent Sound, and Proper became Mastering Engineer of Darcy Proper Mastering. Her most recent projects involve mastering in immersive audio formats.

In 2019, she moved to U.S. and joined Valhalla Studios NY along with husband Ronald Prent.  Valhalla Studios installed the first analog immersive console in the world, which Prent mixes on and Proper masters from.

Grammy Awards 
Proper has won four Grammy Awards from eleven nominations.

References 

Year of birth missing (living people)
Living people
Mastering engineers
Grammy Award winners